Kochabakhari  is a village development committee in Saptari District in the Sagarmatha Zone of south-eastern Nepal. At the time of the 2011 Nepal census it had a population of 6,241 people living in 1,334 individual households.

This VDC has 3 villages namely Lokharam, Kochabakhari & kupahi. Lokharam is the largest village among them. Lokharam is situated near Bhaluwahi river. Indian border lies only 3 km away from this village. Main occupation of the people of this village is farming. Few people are also serving in Government offices of Nepal.

References

Populated places in Saptari District
VDCs in Saptari District